Rick Amor (born 3 March 1948 ) is an Australian artist and figurative painter. He was an Official War Artist for Australia.

Life and work
Rick Amor was born in Frankston, Victoria, Australia. He has a certificate in art from the Caulfield Institute of Technology, and Associate Diploma in Painting from the National Gallery School, Melbourne.[1]

He began exhibiting at the Joseph Brown gallery in 1974 and has shown annually at Niagara Galleries since 1983.  Amor has entered the Archibald Prize at over 10 times and been exhibited nine times. He has been the recipient of several Australia Council studio residencies, allowing him to work in London, New York and Barcelona. In 1999 he was one of the first Australian artists to be appointed as the Official War Artist to East Timor by the Australian War Memorial, and the first since the end of the Vietnam War.

Over the course of his artistic career, Amor has held over 70 solo exhibitions and over 100 group shows. In 2013 a 30th Anniversary exhibition of his extended practice was held at Niagara Galleries. In 1990 McClelland Gallery curated a major survey exhibition of his paintings, which went on to tour various regional galleries in Victoria and South Australia throughout 1990 and 1991. An exhibition of his prints toured various regional galleries in Victoria and Tasmania between 1993 and 1994.[2] In 1993 another exhibition staged by Bendigo Art Gallery toured Australia. Amor's most recent exhibitions include Rick Amor: Contemporary Romantic at Art Gallery of South Australia, Adelaide in 2017, Rick Amor: 21 Portraits at the National Portrait Gallery in Canberra in 2014, Rick Amor: From Study to Painting in 2013 at Castlemaine Art Gallery and Historical Museum, Victoria, and an exhibition at the Australian Print Workshop in 2012. Recent significant group shows have included the 2017 Blue Chip XIX: The Collectors’ Exhibition, at Niagara Galleries, the Melbourne Art Fair, Melbourne, and the Small Sculpture Fair at McClelland Sculpture Park and Gallery in 2013.

In 2005, Peter Berner interviewed Amor for a documentary about the Archibald Prize entitled Loaded Brush. Major texts on Amor's work have also been published in the last twenty years, including Barry Pearce's 100 Moments in Australian Painting (2014), Gary Catalano’s biography, The Solitary Watcher: Rick Amor and his Art (2001), and Gavin Fry’s monograph, Rick Amor(2008.

Paintings 
Rick Amor's work borrows heavily from the pictorial traditions of Symbolism and Surrealism. The legacy of these art movements manifests within the poetic quality of Amor's style. Amor's handling of light and his alluring manipulation of depth of field in his paintings achieves a sustained sense of tension and mystery that insinuates a multiplicity of meanings. His works include psychologically potent symbolism and his landscapes in particular convey a disquieting atmosphere, with objects saturated by contrasting light and shadows. His major recurring subjects are the solitary watcher, figures at twilight, the vast emptiness of urban spaces and quiet mysterious interiors. Even throughout his journalistic works, such his war paintings of East Timor his works are captivating for their unfathomable subtexts.

Sebastian Smee wrote in a review of Amor's 2008 retrospective exhibition at Heide Museum of Modern Art, that he was:

Sculpture 
Since the early 1990s, Rick Amor has also incorporated sculpture into art practice.  Amor typically works in the medium of bronze for his sculptural works. He begins the process of creating each mould at home, which he then has cast in foundry using the Lost-wax casting method. Amor's sculptures are object and figure based, and are often incredibly textural to achieve an impression rather than a replication of the subject.

Amor's skill in the medium of sculpture has been recognised by The National Gallery, Canberra who has purchased a two-metre-high bronze sculpture of a dog – "a made-up dog, a survivor".

Moreover, in November 2007 Rick Amor won the prestigious $100,000 McClelland Sculpture Award for his haunting work Relic.

artsACT commissioned a version of Relic for the city of Canberra, which is in situ near the intersection of Childers Street and University Avenue.. images

Collections 
Rick Amor is represented in numerous private and permanent public collections. Australian public collections include National Gallery of Australia, Canberra; National Portrait Gallery, Canberra; Ballarat Fine Art Gallery, Ballarat; Heide Museum of Modern Art, Victoria; Geelong Gallery, State Library of Victoria; Castlemaine Art Museum; as well as numerous state, regional and university collections throughout Australia.

Awards
2014 The Australian Print Workshop George Collie Memorial Award, The Australian Print Workshop, Melbourne 
2007 The McClelland Award, McClelland Gallery+Sculpture Park, Victoria 
2000 Awarded the Visual Arts/Craft Board London Studio, England
1995 Awarded the Visual Arts/Craft Board Green Street Studio, New York
1991 Awarded the Visual Arts/Craft Board Barcelona Studio, Spain
1989 National Australia Bank Art Prize
1987 Castlemaine Drawing Prize (Second Prize)
1980 Artist in Residence, Victorian Trades Hall Council
1975 Visual Arts Board Grant
1968 National Gallery Traveling Scholarship
1967 National Gallery Drawing Prize (shared)
Hugh Ramsey Portrait Prize

References 
 Gavin Fry (2008) Rick Amor, Beagle Press. , .
 Gary Catalano (2001) The Solitary Watcher: Rick Amor and His Art, Melbourne University Publishing. .
 Davida Allen, Rick Amor, Stephanie Burns et al. (2000) The Australian Drawing, Australian National University.

External links 
 The artist's website
Rick Amor: An Online Catalogue Raisonné of the Prints by Irena Zdanowicz - http://catalogue.rickamor.com.au/
Niagara Galleries
 Art Right Now
 Making Portraits
 Rick Amor at Australian Art
 Work in the Ballarat Fine Art Gallery
 A retrospective exhibition at the Heide Museum of Modern Art
 Images of 60 prints by Rick Amor
 Liverpool Street Gallery 
 A single mind: Rick Amor 22 March – 13 July 2008, Heide Museum of Modern Art. Education Kit: Part A pdf, Part B pdf, Part c pdf

Australian painters
20th-century Australian sculptors
Australian printmakers
Living people
1948 births
Australian war artists
21st-century Australian sculptors
Artists from Melbourne
People from Frankston, Victoria